Countess of Surrey is a title that may be given to a peeress in her own right or to the wife of the Earl of Surrey. Women who have held the title include:

Countesses in their own right
Isabel de Warenne, Countess of Surrey (c.1137–c.1203)

Countesses by marriage
Gundred, Countess of Surrey (d. 1085)
Elizabeth of Vermandois, Countess of Leicester (c.1085–1131)
Maud Marshal (1192-1248)
Joan of Bar, Countess of Surrey (d. 1361)
Elizabeth Tilney, Countess of Surrey (c.1445-1497)
Agnes Howard, Duchess of Norfolk (c.1477–May 1545)
Frances de Vere, Countess of Surrey (c. 1517-1577)